Cypherpunks: Freedom and the Future of the Internet is a 2012 book by Julian Assange, in discussion with Internet activists and cypherpunks Jacob Appelbaum, Andy Müller-Maguhn and Jérémie Zimmermann. Its primary topic is society's relationship with information security. In the book, the authors warn that the Internet has become a tool of the police state, and that the world is inadvertently heading toward a form of totalitarianism. They promote the use of cryptography to protect against state surveillance.

In the introduction, Assange says that the book is "not a manifesto [...] [but] a warning". He told Guardian journalist Decca Aitkenhead:

Assange later wrote in The Guardian: "Strong cryptography is a vital tool in fighting state oppression." saying that was the message of his book, Cypherpunks.

Cypherpunks is published by OR Books. Its content derives from discussions in June 2012 with Appelbaum, Müller-Maguhn and Zimmermann on Assange's TV show World Tomorrow.

Topics by chapter 
 Increased communication versus increased surveillance
 The militarization of cyberspace
 Fighting total surveillance with the laws of man
 Private sector spying
 Fighting total surveillance with the laws of physics
 The Internet and politics
 The Internet and economics
 Censorship
 Privacy for the weak, transparency for the powerful
 Rats in the opera house

See also 
 Computer and network surveillance
 Secrecy

References

External links 
 

2012 non-fiction books
Julian Assange
OR Books books
Computer security books
Cryptography
Internet privacy
Works about privacy
Cypherpunks